Complexo - Universo Paralelo is a 2011 Portuguese documentary film about life in the most dangerous favela in Rio de Janeiro, Complexo do Alemão, directed by Mário Patrocínio.

Reception
It's the third highest-grossing Portuguese documentary film at the Portuguese box office since 2004, with a total box office gross of €85,367.04 and also the third with the highest number of admissions, with 17,042.

In Público's Ípsilon, Jorge Mourinha gave the film a rating of "mediocre".

References

External links

2011 documentary films
2011 films
Portuguese documentary films
Films shot in Rio de Janeiro (city)
Documentary films about poverty
Documentary films about cities
Poverty in Brazil